Karin's Face (Swedish title: Karins ansikte) is a 14-minute film directed by Ingmar Bergman and focusing on Bergman's mother, Karin. The film consists of still photos of Bergman's mother and other family members shown over a simple piano score by Bergman's former wife, Käbi Laretei, with no narration. It was photographed by Bergman's longtime collaborator and neighbour, Arne Carlsson. It was completed in 1983 but first publicly shown on Swedish Television on 29 September 1986.

External links
Ingmar Bergman Foundation about the film
 

1980s short documentary films
1986 films
Films directed by Ingmar Bergman
Films with screenplays by Ingmar Bergman
Films without speech
1980s Swedish-language films
Swedish short documentary films
1980s Swedish films